Joseph Maria Ernst Christian Wilhelm von Radowitz (6 February 1797 – 25 December 1853) was a conservative Prussian statesman and general famous for his proposal to unify Germany under Prussian leadership by means of a negotiated agreement among the reigning German princes.

Early years
Radowitz was born to Roman Catholic nobility in  Blankenburg am Harz, in Brunswick-Wolfenbüttel.  His family being of Serb-Hungarian origin.  He received a military education in France and fought in Napoleon's army.  
As a young lieutenant in the Westphalian artillery, Radowitz was wounded and taken prisoner at the battle of Leipzig (1813), subsequently entered the Hanoverian service, and in 1823 that of Prussia.  
His promotion was rapid, and in 1830 he became chief of the general staff of the artillery.

Prussian envoy
In 1836, Radowitz went as Prussian military plenipotentiary to the federal diet at Frankfurt, and in 1842 was appointed envoy to the courts of Karlsruhe, Darmstadt and Nassau.  He had early become an intimate friend of the crown prince (afterwards King Frederick William IV), and the Prussian constitution of February 1847 was an attempt to realize the ideas put forward by him in his Gespräche aus den Gegenwart der Staat und Kirche, published under the pseudonym "Waldheim" in 1846.

Promoting Prussian unionist policy
In November 1847 and March 1848 Radowitz was sent by Frederick William to Vienna to attempt to arrange common action for the reconstruction of the German Confederation.  In the Frankfurt Parliament he was leader of the conservative Right; and, after its break-up, he was zealous in promoting the Unionist policy of Prussia, which he defended both in the Prussian diet and in the Erfurt parliament.

Prussian foreign minister
He was practically responsible for the foreign policy of Prussia from May 1848 onwards, and on 27 September 1851 he was appointed minister of foreign affairs.  He resigned, however, on 2 November, owing to the king's refusal to settle the difficulties with the Austrian Empire by an appeal to arms.

Literary pursuits
In August 1852, he was appointed director of military education, but the rest of his life was devoted mainly to literary pursuits. Radowitz published, in addition to several political treatises, Ikonographie der Heiligen, im Beitrag zur Kunstgeschichte (Berlin, 1834) and Devisen und Mottos des spätern Mittelalters (ii., 1850). His Gesammelte Schriften were published in 5 vols. at Berlin, 1852–53.

Death
Radowitz died on 25 December 1853 in Berlin.

Orders and decorations

Sources
Josef von Radowitz. Nachgelassene Briefe und Aufzeichnungen zur Geschichte der Jahre 1848-1853. W. Moring (ed.) (1922).

References 

Attribution
 
 
 

1797 births
1853 deaths
Lieutenant generals of Prussia
Prussian politicians
German untitled nobility
German military personnel of the Napoleonic Wars
French military personnel of the Napoleonic Wars
People from the Duchy of Brunswick
Members of the Frankfurt Parliament
Foreign ministers of Prussia
Commanders of the Order of the Dannebrog
Chevaliers of the Légion d'honneur
Recipients of the Order of St. Anna, 2nd class